Petrivka is an urban-type settlement in the Bakhmut Raion, Donetsk Oblast (province) of eastern Ukraine. Population:

Demographics
Native language as of the Ukrainian Census of 2001:
 Ukrainian 95.15%
 Russian 4.61%
 Belarusian and Moldovan (Romanian) 0.08%

References

Urban-type settlements in Bakhmut Raion